Oğuzeli District is a district of Gaziantep Province of Turkey. Its seat is the town Oğuzeli.

References

Districts of Gaziantep Province